Seed is a 2007 Canadian horror film written, produced, and directed by Uwe Boll. Filming ran from July 17 to  August 11, 2006 in British Columbia, Canada, on a $10 million budget.

Plot
As a boy, a reclusive and antisocial Sufferton resident, Max Seed, was disfigured in a school bus crash that killed everyone involved. In 1973, Seed began torturing and murdering people, filming some of his victims starving to death in his locked basement and racking up a body count of 666. In 1979, Detective Matt Bishop arrests Seed in a siege that claims the lives of five of Bishop's fellow officers. Seed is sentenced to death by electric chair and incarcerated on an island prison, where he is a model inmate, only acting out when he kills three guards who try to rape him.

On Seed's execution date, the electric chair fails to kill him after two shocks. Not wanting Seed to be released due to a state law that says any convicted criminal who survives three jolts of 15,000 volts each for 45 seconds walks, the prison staff and Bishop declare Seed dead and bury him alive in the prison cemetery. Seed digs his way out of his grave a few hours later and returns to the prison, where he kills the executioner, doctor, and warden before swimming back to the mainland. The next day, while investigating the massacre, Bishop realizes Seed was responsible when he discovers the serial killer's empty cemetery plot.

Over several months, Seed kills dozens of people, with one long shot showing him beating a bound woman with a lumberjack's axe for five straight minutes. One day, a videotape showing Bishop's house is sent to the detective's office. Knowing this means Seed will go after his family, Bishop races home, finding his wife, Sandy, and daughter, Emily, gone, and the four officers charged with guarding the house dismembered in the bathroom.

Driving to Seed's old residence, Bishop is lured into a basement room containing a television and a video camera and locked inside. The television turns on and depicts Seed with Sandy and Emily. Emily informs Bishop that Seed wants Bishop to shoot himself, but Sandy tells him not to do it, claiming Seed will kill them anyway. Bishop tries to negotiate by having Seed shoot him himself, but Seed does not accept it and kills Sandy with a nail gun, prompting Bishop into shooting himself in the head, believing that doing so will make Seed release his daughter. Instead, Seed takes the daughter to the room containing her father's corpse and locks her in it, leaving them to die. As Emily sobs for her two dead parents, the film ends as Seed is free to continue his killing spree with no end.

Cast
Michael Paré as Detective Matthew Bishop
Will Sanderson as Maxwell "Max" Seed
Ralf Möller as Warden Arnold Calgrove
Jodelle Ferland as Emily Bishop
Thea Gill as Sandra Bishop
Andrew Jackson as Doctor Parker Wickson
Brad Turner as Officer Thompson
Phillip Mitchell as Officer Simpson
Mike Dopud as Officer Flynn
John Sampson as Officer Ward
Tyron Leitso as Officer Jeffery
Michael Eklund as Executioner

Release
The film was shown on the Weekend of Fear Festival in Erlangen, Germany on April 27, 2007. Director Uwe Boll was there to present the film and also to answer questions. Before the film started Boll emphasized the brutality of the film. Furthermore, he pointed out that PETA, who receive 2.5% of worldwide sales of the film, made archival recordings of animal cruelty available for the use in Seeds introduction, though this footage was obscured on-screen. Boll stated that this alteration had occurred in the processing laboratory without his knowledge.

Home media

The DVD release includes a trailer for the film and an Executing Seed featurette. The DVD also includes a short film by Richard Gale titled Criticized and a copy of the video game Advent Rising for PC, both which are unrelated to the Seed film.

Reception
Jonathan Melton of the Eye for Film gave the rating of one star out of five, explaining "endless faults" with the film: "the characters are uninteresting and forgettable, the dialogue is almost non-existent, the plot is riddled with holes. In short, this is not a good movie (the lowest rating on Eye For Film is one star, but if I could I would give it less)." The DVD release was also struck down with one of five score, with the review stating that "almost by accident, [the featurette] manages to tell you more about a film set than dozens of other behind the scenes features on better films."

Johnny Butane of Dread Central gave the film a score of two out of five.

Awards
Best Special Effects – 2007 New York City Horror Film Festival

Sequel

A sequel, directed by Marcel Walz and entitled Blood Valley: Seed's Revenge, was released in 2014. It was produced by Boll, and stars Caroline Williams, Christa Campbell, Nick Principe, Jared Demetri Luciano, Manoush, Natalie Scheetz, Annika Strauss, and Sarah Hayden.

References

External links

2007 films
2007 horror films
2000s slasher films
Canadian films about revenge
English-language Canadian films
2000s English-language films
Films directed by Uwe Boll
Films about animal cruelty
2000s exploitation films
Films based on urban legends
Films about capital punishment
Films set in 1979
Films set in 1980
Films set on islands
Films shot in British Columbia
People for the Ethical Treatment of Animals
Canadian nonlinear narrative films
Police detective films
Canadian prison drama films
Canadian serial killer films
Canadian slasher films
Films about snuff films
Canadian splatter films
2000s prison drama films
2000s Canadian films